David Mistrafović (born 25 May 2001) is a Swiss professional footballer who plays as a midfielder for Eerste Divisie club Helmond Sport.

Club career
He joined Kriens on loan before the 2020–21 season. On 23 July 2021, the loan was extended for another year.

Mistrafović joined Dutch Eerste Divisie club Helmond Sport on 22 June 2022, signing a three-year deal.

International career
Mistrafović was born in Switzerland and is of Bosnian and Croatian descent. He is a youth international for Switzerland

References

External links 
SFV U19 Profile

2001 births
Sportspeople from Lucerne
Swiss people of Croatian descent
Swiss people of Bosnia and Herzegovina descent
Living people
Swiss men's footballers
Swiss expatriate footballers
Association football midfielders
Switzerland youth international footballers
FC Luzern players
SC Kriens players
Helmond Sport players
Swiss Super League players
Swiss Challenge League players
Expatriate footballers in the Netherlands
Swiss expatriate sportspeople in the Netherlands